Adolfo Linvel (1911 – July 8, 1986) was an Argentine actor. He starred in the 1950 film Arroz con leche under director Carlos Schlieper. He gained widespread fame in the role of the father of Los Campanelli, a popular Argentine TV sitcom in the 1970s.

Selected filmography
 Isabelita (1940)
 Saint Candida (1945)
 Valentina (1950)
 The New Bell (1950)
 The Unwanted (1951)

References

External links

 
 

Argentine male film actors
1911 births
1986 deaths
20th-century Argentine male actors